Mary Stewart's Merlin Trilogy is an omnibus edition of the first three novels in Mary Stewart's Arthurian Saga: The Crystal Cave (1970), The Hollow Hills (1973), and The Last Enchantment (1979). The omnibus was published in 1980 by William Morrow and Company. In 1983, Stewart published a fourth instalment in the series: The Wicked Day. 

HarperCollins republished the omnibus as The Merlin Trilogy in 2004.

Synopsis
The Crystal Cave (1970) is a first-person retelling of Merlin's life and the reign of Uther Pendragon until the conception of Uther's son, Arthur. In The Hollow Hills (1973), Merlin recounts Arthur's birth and boyhood until he is made king. The Last Enchantment (1979) is the story of Arthur's kingship as told by Merlin.

Reception
In Stewart's obituary, Anita Gates of The New York Times described her as an "author of romantic thrillers who jumped genres in her 50s to create an internationally best-selling trilogy of Merlin books, reimagining the Arthurian legend from a sorcerer’s point of view. … Reading Geoffrey of Monmouth's History of the Kings of Britain, [Stewart] was inspired to retell the story of King Arthur as seen by Merlin, the king's adviser and house magician. The trilogy introduced her work to a new generation and, in many cases, to male readers for the first time. … The books, set in the fifth century, were praised for their unusual blend of fantasy and historical detail."

See also
 Bibliography of King Arthur
 Matter of Britain

References

Further reading
 

Book series introduced in 1970
Fantasy novel trilogies
Works based on Merlin
Novels by Mary Stewart
Modern Arthurian fiction